Žilić is a Serbo-Croatian surname. Notable people with the surname include:

Dragan Žilić (born 1974), Serbian footballer
Tonči Žilić (born 1975), Croatian footballer

Serbian surnames
Croatian surnames